Kamil Kreps (born November 18, 1984) is a Czech professional ice hockey player who currently plays with HC Oceláři Třinec of the Czech Extraliga.

Playing career
As a youth, Kreps played in the 1998 Quebec International Pee-Wee Hockey Tournament with a team from Chomutov.

Kreps played his junior hockey in the Ontario Hockey League (OHL) playing for the Brampton Battalion for three seasons. He scored 19 goals in each of his three seasons and had a high of 61 points in 2002–03. He was drafted in the second round, 38th overall, by the Florida Panthers in the 2003 NHL Entry Draft.

In the 2006-07 season, he played his first NHL game with the Panthers on January 7, 2007, against the Vancouver Canucks, registering two shots on net. Kreps scored his first NHL goal on April 6 against the Tampa Bay Lightning.

In the 2010 European Trophy tournament, Kreps won the scoring league while with Oulun Kärpät  in the regulation round, totalling 11 points (5 goals, 6 assists) in 8 games.

After four European seasons abroad, Kreps opted to return to his native Czech Republic in signing a one-year deal with HC Oceláři Třinec on May 1, 2014.

On February 12, 2012, he scored his first international goal for the Czech Republic during their 4–0 win over Russia in the 2012 European Hockey Tournament.

Career statistics

Regular season and playoffs

International

References

External links

1984 births
Living people
Ässät players
Barys Nur-Sultan players
Brampton Battalion players
Czech ice hockey centres
Florida Panthers draft picks
Florida Panthers players
EHC Kloten players
HC Oceláři Třinec players
Oulun Kärpät players
Rochester Americans players
San Antonio Rampage players
Czech expatriate ice hockey players in Germany
Texas Wildcatters players
People from Litoměřice
Sportspeople from the Ústí nad Labem Region
Czech expatriate ice hockey players in Canada
Czech expatriate ice hockey players in the United States
Czech expatriate ice hockey players in Finland
Czech expatriate ice hockey players in Switzerland
Czech expatriate sportspeople in Kazakhstan
Expatriate ice hockey players in Kazakhstan